The Ministry of War was a ministry for military affairs of the Kingdom of Bavaria, founded as Ministerium des Kriegswesens on October 1, 1808 by King Maximilian I Joseph of Bavaria. It was located on the Ludwigstraße in Munich.  Today the building, which was built by Leo von Klenze between 1824 and 1830, houses the Bavarian public record office, Bayerisches Hauptstaatsarchiv und Staatsarchiv München.

History 
The ministry was the successional institution of the royal Bavarian Hofkriegsrat (court war council, founded in 1620) and its follow-on institutions that were responsible for the military:
 Oberkriegskollegium (upper war council, after 1799)
 Kriegsjustizrat und Kriegsökonomierat (war justice council and war economic council, after 1801)
 Geheimes Kriegsbureau (privy war bureau, after 1804)

The name of the Ministerium des Kriegswesens changed to Staatsministerium der Armee in 1817, and finally to Kriegsministerium in 1825.

From 1801 to 1817, King Maximilian I Joseph of Bavaria by himself held full command of the Bavarian Army.  In 1817 General von Triva was made the real head of the Ministry by him, but the administration of justice and economics of the military was part of the Oberadministrativkollegium and the Generallazarettinspektion. In 1822 Maximilian I assigned General von Wrede as commander-in-chief of the army, and the Staatsministerium der Armee also became responsible for the administration of justice and economics. After 1829 the tasks and responsibilities of the supreme command of the army (Oberkommando, existing from 1822 to 1829) were transferred to the Minister of War, so that he was additionally commander-in-chief of the army. After acquiring command of the army, the Bavarian war minister had far more extensive responsibilities compared to ministers of other countries, such as the Prussian Minister of War. After the breakdown of the Bavarian kingdom in 1918, the Kriegsministerium was replaced by the Ministerium für militärische Angelegenheiten (ministry of military affairs).

Due to the Weimar Constitution, from 1919 onwards the Bavarian Ministry of Transport and the Ministry for Military Affairs were both disbanded. The former archive of the ministry, which was founded in 1885, became a section of the Bayerisches Hauptstaatsarchiv und Staatsarchiv München. The military troops of Bavaria were subordinated to the Reichswehr, which was under the command of the Reichspräsident. Therefore, the Ministry of War was replaced by the Reichswehrbefehlsstelle Bayern (Reichswehr commanding office Bavaria) until September 1919.

Ministers

References and notes 

Bavaria
Military of Bavaria
Politics of Bavaria
Kingdom of Bavaria
History of Munich
Bavaria, War
Maxvorstadt
Leo von Klenze buildings
1808 establishments in Bavaria